Provincial elections were held in the Netherlands on 20 March 2019. Eligible voters elected the members of the Provincial States in the twelve provinces of the Netherlands. The elections were held on the same day as the 2019 Dutch water boards elections and, in the Caribbean Netherlands, island council elections.

These elections also indirectly determine the composition of the Senate, since the members of the twelve provincial states, alongside electoral colleges elected in the Caribbean Netherlands on the same day, will elect the Senate's 75 members in the Senate election on 27 May, two months after the provincial elections. Because of this, the provincial elections were a test for the third Rutte cabinet, which previously had a majority of one seat in the Senate, but has since lost that majority.

Seats summary

Detailed results

National

By province

Drenthe

Flevoland

Friesland

Gelderland

Groningen

Limburg

North Brabant

North Holland

Overijssel

South Holland

Utrecht

Zeeland

Coalition talks 
Coalition talks in the Netherlands are customarily organized by informateurs appointed by the party that came first in the elections, and then, in the event of a failure, by other parties. Informateurs usually submit a public report on possible coalitions in the weeks following the election.

See also
 2019 Bonaire general election
 2019 Saban general election
 2019 Sint Eustatius general election

Notes

References

Provincial
2019